Homeobox protein Hox-A10 is a protein that in humans is encoded by the HOXA10 gene.

Function 

In vertebrates, the genes encoding the class of transcription factors called homeobox genes are found in clusters named A, B, C, and D on four separate chromosomes. Expression of these proteins is spatially and temporally regulated during embryonic development. This gene is part of the A cluster on chromosome 7 and encodes a DNA-binding transcription factor that may regulate gene expression, morphogenesis, and differentiation. More specifically, it may function in fertility, embryo viability, and regulation of hematopoietic lineage commitment. Alternatively spliced transcript variants encoding different isoforms have been described.
Downregulation of HOXA10 is observed in the human and baboon decidua after implantation and this downregulation promotes trophoblast invasion by activating STAT3

Interactions 

Homeobox A10 has been shown to interact with PTPN6.

See also 
 Homeobox

References

Further reading

External links 
 

Transcription factors